Carolina Cermelli (born 31 January 2001) is a Panamanian swimmer. She competed in the women's 50 metre backstroke event at the 2017 World Aquatics Championships. In 2018, she competed in the girls' 50 metre backstroke event at the 2018 Summer Youth Olympics held in Buenos Aires, Argentina. She did not qualify to compete in the semi-finals.

References

2001 births
Living people
Panamanian female swimmers
Place of birth missing (living people)
Swimmers at the 2018 Summer Youth Olympics
Female backstroke swimmers